Malcolm Wilde Browne (April 17, 1931August 27, 2012) was an American journalist and photographer, best known for his award-winning photograph of the self-immolation of Buddhist monk Thích Quảng Đức in 1963.

Early life and education
Browne was born and raised in New York City. His mother was a Quaker with fervently anti-war opinions, while his father was an architect who was Roman Catholic. Browne attended Friends Seminary, a Quaker school in Manhattan, from kindergarten through to twelfth grade. He later attended Swarthmore College in Pennsylvania and studied chemistry.

Career
Browne's career in journalism began when he was drafted during the Korean War. He was assigned to the Pacific edition of the Stars and Stripes, where he worked for two years. He worked for the Middletown Times Herald-Record, then joined the Associated Press (AP). He worked in Baltimore from 1959 until 1961, at which point he was made chief correspondent for Indochina. On June 11, 1963, he took his famous photographs of the death of Thích Quảng Đức , a Vietnamese Mahayana Buddhist monk who burned himself to death at a busy road intersection in Saigon, in protest against the persecution of Buddhists by the South Vietnamese government led by Ngô Đình Diệm. He won a Pulitzer Prize for International Reporting and received many job offers, eventually leaving the AP in 1965.

Browne worked for ABC TV for about a year but became dissatisfied with television journalism, and worked freelance for several years. He did a year's fellowship at Columbia University with the Council on Foreign Relations. In 1968, he joined The New York Times, becoming its correspondent for South America in 1972. Having worked as a chemist prior to becoming a journalist, in 1977 Browne became a science writer, serving as a senior editor for Discover. He returned to the Times in 1985, and went on to cover the Persian Gulf War in 1991.

Death
Browne died in Hanover, New Hampshire on August 27, 2011, of complications from Parkinson's disease.  He was 81 years old.

Awards and recognition

World Press Photo of the Year (1963)
Pulitzer Prize for International Reporting (1964)
George Polk award for courage in journalism
Overseas Press Club Award
James T. Grady-James H. Stack Award for Interpreting Chemistry for the Public, American Chemical Society (1992)
Honorary Member, Sigma Xi (2002)

Works

Browne, Malcolm W. Muddy Boots and Red Socks, Random House: New York, 1993,  (autobiography) 
Saigon's Finale (article on U.S. military defeat in Vietnam)
The New Face of War (Bobbs-Merrill, Indianapolis, 1965) .  Ground-breaking account of tactics in the Vietnam War.

References

External links

Malcolm Browne interviewed by Charlie Rose, 1995.

Booknotes interview with Browne on Muddy Boots and Red Socks, September 26, 1993.
 USA Today

1931 births
2012 deaths
Journalists from New York City
Swarthmore College alumni
Associated Press reporters
Photography in Vietnam
Pulitzer Prize for International Reporting winners
American war correspondents of the Vietnam War
American science writers
United States Army soldiers
Neurological disease deaths in New Hampshire
Deaths from Parkinson's disease
The New York Times Pulitzer Prize winners
Columbia University people
Friends Seminary alumni
Photographs of protests